Coptosoma is a genus of true bugs belonging to the family Plataspidae, subfamily Plataspinae.

Selected species

References

External links 
 Biolib
 Fauna europaea
 Coptosoma at insectoid.info
 

Shield bugs
Pentatomomorpha genera
Hemiptera of Europe
Taxa described in 1833
Taxa named by François-Louis Laporte, comte de Castelnau